Jupoata is a genus of beetles in the family Cerambycidae, containing the following species:

 Jupoata antonkozlovi Nascimento & Botero, 2018
 Jupoata brenesi Estaban Duran & Martins, 2012
 Jupoata costalimai (Zajciw, 1966)
 Jupoata divaricata Martins & Galileo, 2011
 Jupoata garbei (Melzer, 1922)
 Jupoata germana Martins, Galileo & Oliveira, 2011
 Jupoata gigas Martins & Monné, 2002
 Jupoata jaechi Schmid, 2014
 Jupoata paraensis Martins & Monné, 2002
 Jupoata peruviana (Tippmann, 1960)
 Jupoata robusta Martins & Monné, 2002
 Jupoata rufipennis (Gory in Guérin-Méneville, 1831)
 Jupoata spinosa Martins & Galileo, 2008

References

Cerambycini